Christopher 'Chris' Charles E White (born 15 February 1980) is an English cricketer.  White is a right-handed batsman who bowls right-arm medium pace.  He was born at Epping, Essex.

White represented the Essex Cricket Board in a single List A match against the Surrey Cricket Board in the 2nd round of the 2003 Cheltenham & Gloucester Trophy which was held in 2002.  In his only List A match, he took 2 wickets at a bowling average of 17.00, with figures of 2/34.

He currently plays club cricket for Fives and Heronians Cricket Club in the Essex Premier League.

References

External links
Chris White at Cricinfo
Chris White at CricketArchive

1980 births
Living people
People from Epping
Sportspeople from Essex
English cricketers
Essex Cricket Board cricketers